The A407 100mm anti-tank gun M1977 is a Romanian rifled 100-mm anti-tank gun which serves as the main towed anti-tank gun of the Romanian Land Forces from 1975 until present. Versions of the M1977 gun were installed on main battle tanks (TR-77 and TR-85) and ship turrets on river monitors.

History
The A407 100mm anti-tank gun was the first artillery piece designed in Romania after World War II. The first variant of the gun, the M1975 (M stands for Model) had a semi-automatic horizontal sliding wedge type breech lock. The second variant, M1977, had a more practical vertical sliding wedge breech block.

The M1977 can be also used as a field gun at brigade level, as it has a maximum range of 20.6 kilometers. After 1992, the M1977 anti-tank guns were modernized with improved optical sights. The gun can be towed with the DAC 665T truck and has a maximum road speed of 60 km/h on road and 30 km/h off-road.

Variants
 M1975 - used the horizontal sliding wedge breech lock.
 M1977 - used the vertical sliding wedge breech lock.
 M2002 - modernized version of M1977 with a FCS TAT-100.

Adaptations:

 A 308 - tank gun used for TR-77 and TR-85 main battle tanks.
 A 430 - 100 mm gun used for ship turrets.

Operators
  - At least one A407 anti-tank gun was captured in Iraq during the Gulf War by the US Army. The exact number of A407 artillery pieces exported by Communist Romania is unknown. The gun is now the property of the Ohio Army National Guard, the transportation unit (1486th Transportation Company) that captured it.
  - One was delivered in 1993.
 
  - 208 M1977 towed anti-tank guns in 2010.

See also
 T-12 antitank gun
 D-10 tank gun
 100 mm field gun M1944 (BS-3)

References

Citations

Bibliography

External links
 Arsenal Reşiţa website

Video

100 mm artillery
Artillery of Romania
Anti-tank guns of the Cold War